fdupes is a program written by Adrián López to scan directories for duplicate files, with options to list, delete or replace the files with hardlinks pointing to the duplicate. It first compares file sizes, partial MD5 signatures, full MD5 signatures, and then performs a byte-by-byte comparison for verification.

fdupes is written in C and is released under the MIT License.

References

External links 
 Official fdupes homepage
 Enhanced fdupes fork with Windows and Mac OS X binaries available

Unix file system-related software
Software using the MIT license